In a legal terminology, Terms can have different meanings, depending on the specific context.

In Trust Law, Terms generally refers to the Terms of the Trust, meaning the explicit written intention of the Grantor of a Trust.   Terms are limited to provisions expressed in a way that makes them like proof in court.    Terms of a Trust are most clear when they are explicit within the four corners of the Trust Instrument.   However, since not all Trusts are explicit, some interpretation by courts may be necessary.

In Contract Law, Terms means Terms of a Contract, the conditions and warranties agreed upon between parties to the contract.   Contract terms may be verbal or in writing.  Conditions are those terms which are so important that one or more of the parties would not enter into the contract without them.   Warranties are less important terms whose violation does not void the contract, but might entitle one of the parties to receive monetary damages.

In Property law and Constitutional law Terms may mean period(s) of time over which a lease, office, or other privilege is held.

And of course, in many fields of law Terms may be used in the sense of Terminology.

References

Legal terminology